Atyphopsis is a genus of moths in the subfamily Arctiinae. The genus was erected by Arthur Gardiner Butler in 1878.

Species
 Atyphopsis modesta Butler, 1887
 Atyphopsis roseiceps Druce, 1898
 Atyphopsis obscura Hampson, 1898

References

Arctiinae
Moth genera